Sainjargalyn Nyam-Ochir is a retired Mongolian judoka. In 2012, he won bronze at the 2012 Summer Olympics in the 73 kg category.  He beat Christopher Völk in his first match, then Volodymyr Soroka before being beaten by Mansur Isaev in the quarterfinals.  Because Isaev reached the final, Nyam-Ochir was entered into the repechage, where he beat Nicholas Delpopolo on the way to beating Dex Elmont in their bronze medal match.

Nyam-Ochir is currently a coach at Eastside Dojo in Plano, TX.

References

External links
 
 
 
 

1986 births
Living people
Mongolian male judoka
Olympic judoka of Mongolia
Judoka at the 2012 Summer Olympics
Olympic bronze medalists for Mongolia
Olympic medalists in judo
People from Uvs Province
Medalists at the 2012 Summer Olympics
Judoka at the 2006 Asian Games
Universiade medalists in judo
Universiade bronze medalists for Mongolia
Asian Games competitors for Mongolia
Medalists at the 2009 Summer Universiade
20th-century Mongolian people
21st-century Mongolian people